Charles A. Foster was an early member of the Latter Day Saint movement. He was the brother of Robert D. Foster.

Foster-Higbee embroilment

The History of the Church records Foster's arrest in Nauvoo, Illinois.

The May 1, 1844, edition of the Nauvoo Neighbor contained a statement from Marshal Greene alleging that Foster "drew a double-barrel pistol on Mr. [Joseph] Smith".
The Mayor [Smith] ordered me to arrest these three men for refusing to assist me in the discharge of my duty; and when attempting to arrest them, they all resisted, and with horrid imprecations threatened to shoot.

I called for help, and there not being sufficient, the Mayor laid hold on the two Fosters at the same time. At that instant Charles A. Foster drew a double-barrel pistol on Mr. Smith, but it was instantly wrenched from his hand; and afterwards he declared he would have shot the Mayor, if we had let his pistol alone, and also he would thank God for the privilege of ridding the world of a tyrant!
[...]
However, the three were arrested and brought before the Mayor [...] upon which evidence the court assessed a fine of one hundred dollars to each of the above-named aggressors.

According to History of the Church, Smith said that "about May 27", Foster had informed Smith of a conspiracy against his life.

Nauvoo Expositor and the death of Joseph Smith

In 1844, Foster became a publisher of the Nauvoo Expositor.

In a letter to the Warsaw Signal published June 11, 1844, Foster wrote of the destruction of the press.

Smith's order to the destroy the newspaper's press ultimately led to Smith's arrest and death while awaiting trial.

References

American Latter Day Saints
British Latter Day Saints
English Latter Day Saints
Nauvoo Expositor publishers
People excommunicated by the Church of Christ (Latter Day Saints)
Year of birth missing
Year of death missing